Zárate is a port city in the northeast of the . It lies on the western shore of the Paraná River,  from Buenos Aires. It is the headquarters for and the only city in the partido of the same name.

Zárate and Campana are main points of an important industrial region. The city is located at one end of the Zárate-Brazo Largo Bridge, which joins Buenos Aires with the province of Entre Ríos and allows communication with the Argentine Mesopotamia and from there to Brazil and Uruguay.

The city was founded on March 19, 1854.

History 
Following European colonization, the lands were distributed in grants. The first Spanish owners weren't able to use them productively, so their ownership was passed to the Jesuits, who were then expelled by Charles III of Spain.

The Zárate Partido was founded on March 19, 1854, separating it from Exaltación de la Cruz.

References

In Spanish.
 Municipality of Zárate - Official website

Gallery

Populated places in Buenos Aires Province
Paraná River
Port settlements in Argentina
Populated places established in 1854
1854 establishments in Argentina
Cities in Argentina
Argentina